Coronidium rupicola, commonly known as the yellow button, is a plant in the family Asteraceae. It is endemic to Queensland, Australia.

References

External links
 
 
 View a map of historical sightings of this species at the Australasian Virtual Herbarium
 View observations of this species on iNaturalist
 View images of this species on Flickriver

rupicola
Endemic flora of Queensland

Plants described in 2008